Surrender is the third studio album by English synth-pop duo Hurts. It was released on 9 October 2015 by Columbia Records. The album spawned the singles "Some Kind of Heaven", "Rolling Stone", "Lights", "Slow", and "Wish". Surrender debuted at number 12 on the UK Albums Chart, selling 5,636 copies in its first week.

Track listing

Notes
  signifies a remixer

Personnel
Credits adapted from the liner notes of the deluxe edition of Surrender.

Hurts
 Hurts – production 
 Theo Hutchcraft – vocals ; programming 
 Adam Anderson – guitar, keyboards ; programming ; synthesiser 

Additional personnel

 Malin Abrahamsson – mixing engineering 
 Ken Berglund – engineering 
 Eric Boulanger – mastering engineering 
 Martin Forslund – engineering ; production 
 Lael Goldberg – bass guitar 
 Jennifer Götvall – mixing engineering 
 Matty Green – mixing engineering 
 Mathieu Jomphe – production, programming 
 Jon von Letcher – guitar, programming 
 Paulo Mendonça – bass guitar, guitar 
 Stuart Price – guitar, keyboards, production, programming, synthesiser 
 Jonas Quant – production 
 Ariel Rechtshaid – engineering, production 
 Emily Rumbles – mastering engineering 
 Karianne Rundqvist – mixing engineering 
 Tina Sunnero – mixing engineering 
 Jack Tarrant – engineering 
 Ursine Vulpine – strings

Charts

References

2015 albums
Albums produced by Ariel Rechtshaid
Albums produced by Stuart Price
Columbia Records albums
Hurts albums